The M621 is a  loop of motorway in West Yorkshire, England that takes traffic into central Leeds between the M1 and M62 motorways.

History
The first section of the M621 to open, known at the time as the 'South West Urban Motorway', extended from the M62 to junction 3 in central Leeds where it used to terminate at a roundabout which was also the terminus of the M1 motorway. This section opened in stages, first from the M62 to junction 1 in 1971 (this was originally numbered M65), and then next from junction 1 to junction 3 in 1973.

When the M1 was diverted away from Leeds when the 'M1 – A1 Lofthouse to Bramham' extension opened in 1999 adjustments were made to junction 3 and the Leeds section of the M1 was re-designated as M621, given junction 3 to junction 7).

Junctions
{| class="plainrowheaders wikitable"
|-
!scope=col|County
!scope=col|Location
!scope=col|mi
!scope=col|km
!scope=col|Junction
!scope=col|Destinations
!scope=col|Notes
|-
|rowspan="10"|West Yorkshire
|Morley
|0
|0
|—
|  - Manchester ; - Bradford ; - Leeds, Birstall
|
|-
|rowspan="9"|Leeds
|3.2
|5.1
|1
| - Leeds ring road
|
|-
|3.9
|6.2
|2
| - Leeds
|
|-
|4.3
|7.0
| bgcolor="ffdddd" |2a
| bgcolor="ffdddd" | - Beeston, Holbeck
| bgcolor="ffdddd" |Westbound exit and eastbound entrance only
|-
|4.8
|7.8
|3
| - Leeds Centre, Beeston
|
|-
|5.2
|8.4
|4
| - Leeds Centre, Hunslet
|
|-
|5.6
|9.0
|5
| - Leeds Centre, Beeston
|
|-
|6.3
|10.1
| bgcolor="ffdddd" |6
| bgcolor="ffdddd" |Belle Isle
| bgcolor="ffdddd" |Eastbound exit and westbound entrance only
|-
|6.9
|11.1
|7
| - Leeds, Stourton ; - Robin Hood
|
|-
|8.0
|12.9
| bgcolor="ffdddd" |—
| bgcolor="ffdddd" |  - London 
| bgcolor="ffdddd" |Northbound entrance and southbound exit only
|-

*Ceremonial Counties
Coordinate list

Gallery

References

External links

 CBRD Motorway Database – M621

Motorways in England
Transport in Leeds
Roads in Yorkshire